Gijs Lagervey
  Fabrizio Lai
  Teuvo Länsivuori
  Carlos Lavado
  Eddie Lawson
  Eddie Laycock
  Eugenio Lazzarini
  Gianni Leoni
  Libero Liberati
  Dan Linfoot
  Joey Litjens
  Roberto Locatelli
  Johnny Lockett
  Bill Lomas
  Dino Lombardi
  Juan López Mella
  Enrico Lorenzetti
  Jorge Lorenzo
  Marco Lucchinelli
  Thomas Lüthi
  Ernie Lyons
  Sam Lowes
  Luca Lunetta

 L